Denis Krestinin (born April 15, 1994) is a Lithuanian basketball player for PVSK Panthers of the Nemzeti Bajnokság I/A, the top division in Hungary.

International career
Krestinin represented Lithuania in the U–16, U–18, U–19 and U–20 youth tournaments.

References

External links
 

1994 births
Living people
BK Barons players
BK Jūrmala players
Forwards (basketball)
KB Prishtina players
Lithuanian men's basketball players
Lithuanian expatriate basketball people in Latvia
Lithuanian expatriate basketball people in Poland
Basketball players from Vilnius
Turów Zgorzelec players